American singer William DeVaughn has released three studio albums, including a record selling nearly two million copies on its release in spring 1974 (#1 within the  R&B charts and #4 on the Billboard Hot 100 chart). The track "Be Thankful for What You Got" first (1974) peaked at #31 in the UK Singles Chart and later (1980) at #44. 

Discographies of American artists
Rhythm and blues discographies
Soul music discographies
Be Thankful for What You Got (1974)
Figures Can't Calculate (1980)
"Creme De Creme (1980)
Time Will Stand Still (2008)
"Staying Power"(2014)
"Love In Any Language "(2016)
"What Does It Take ( to win your love for me)" &" I Gotta Dance To keep From Crying"" (2017)